Bohuslav Diviš (December 20 1942 in Prague – July 26 1976 in Normal, Illinois, United States) was a Czech mathematician, who worked in the field of number theory.

Bohuslav Diviš won the Czechoslovak and International Mathematical Olympiad in 1959 and then studied mathematics at Charles University in Prague (as a student of Vojtěch Jarník). He wrote his thesis in 1966 and his doctorate in 1969 with a thesis on " superlattice points in multidimensional ellipsoids " at the Heidelberg University under Peter Roquette.

In 1970 Diviš became Assistant Professor at Ohio State University (USA), and after 1973 an Associate Professor.

During a conference visit to Illinois State University he died of heart failure at the age of 33.

He authored about 20 scientific articles.

Literature 
 B. Diviš: On the sums of continued fractions, Acta Arithmetica 22, 157–173, 1973
 ders.: Lattice point theory of irrational ellipsoids with an arbitrary center, Monatsh. Math. 83, 279–307,  1977
 ders.: Ω-estimates in lattice point theory, Acta Arithmetica 35, 247–258, 1979
 F. Fricker: Einführung in die Gitterpunktlehre, Birkhäuser, 1982

References 

Number theorists
1942 births
1976 deaths
Charles University alumni